Garrowby Hill is a 1998 painting by David Hockney of the Yorkshire-landmark of the same name.  The painting is in the collection of the Boston Museum of Fine Arts.

Painting
The painting was completed in 1998. Hockney had spent a number of years living in Los Angeles before moving back to his native Yorkshire in the late 1990s. Following the move back to England, Hockney completed several landscape paintings of Yorkshire scenery, one of which was Garrowby Hill.

The painting is of the tallest point in the Yorkshire Wolds, which is the highest point of Bishop Wilton Wold and given its name due to the proximity to the village of Garrowby, near York.

A second print of the Garrowby Hill painting was created in 2010, which is often confused for the 1998 original.

Exhibitions
It was displayed as part of Hockney's 2017 retrospective at Tate Britain in London.

References

External links
 http://www.david-hockney.org/garrowby-hill

Paintings by David Hockney
Yorkshire in art
1998 paintings
Landscape paintings
Pocklington